Power of the Press is a 1943 American crime film directed by Lew Landers and starring Guy Kibbee, Gloria Dickson, Lee Tracy, Otto Kruger and Victor Jory.

Plot
Ulysses Bradford (Guy Kibbee) is a small-town newspaper publisher who is called in to protect a big-city paper that has come under control of an isolationist, played by Otto Kruger. Tracy plays the managing editor, who has been going along with the regime but suffers a crisis of conscience when Kruger has the paper's publisher murdered and frames an ex-employee (an unbilled Larry Parks), making up and printing lurid details of the crime to boost circulation.

Cast
 Guy Kibbee as Ulysses Bradford
 Gloria Dickson as Edwina Stephens
 Lee Tracy as Griff Thompson
 Otto Kruger as Howard Raskin
 Victor Jory as Oscar Trent

References

External links
 
 

1943 films
Films directed by Lew Landers
American drama films
Columbia Pictures films
Films about journalists
American black-and-white films
1943 drama films
1940s American films
1940s English-language films